Chrysomantis congica is a species of praying mantis endemic to  the Congo River region.

See also
List of mantis genera and species

References

Chrysomantis
Mantodea of Africa
Insects of the Democratic Republic of the Congo
Insects of the Republic of the Congo
Insects described in 1987